Frestech (Xinfei Electric Co., Ltd.) is a Chinese-foreign joint venture jointly invested in and established by Henan Xinfei Electric (Group) Co. Ltd., Singapore Hong Leong Corporation Ltd and Hn-sin Electric Pte Ltd in October, 1994.

Currently, it is the biggest producer of non-CFC refrigerators in China with total assets of 2400 million Yuan, 6000 staff and an annual production capacity of 2.6 million units. Since the 1990s Xinfei Co. has been listed as one of the 500 biggest industrial enterprises in China, one of the 200 Strongest Light Industrial Enterprises in China, and on the list of the 10 Strongest Enterprises in the Domestic Electric Appliances Industry. 

It has also won the Vanguard Enterprise for Quality and Efficiency award, and the China Star Enterprise award. In the list of the Top 500 Industrial Enterprises, Comprehensive Assessment 95 announced by the state commission of Economy and Trade and the State Bureau of Statistics, Xinfei,  ranked 17th, leaped to first place in the national refrigerator industry rankings.

Its main products —— the Xinfei series of refrigerator/freezers, includes more than 50 models of frost and frost-free refrigerators as well as more than 30 models of freezers. —— have been graded as Famous Products in China.  Xinfei is the first among green refrigerator brands in China.

Xinfei's development is gaining momentum with its comprehensive economic indices showing an annual increase of 40%. It achieved an output and sales volume of 1 million units of refrigerators in 1996, 1997, 1998 and in 1999. And sales revenue of over 2,000 million yuan every year. It has become the biggest production base of refrigerators in China with its market share reaching 13%.

In Singapore dollar terms, Xinfei’s revenue was $758.7 million in 2006 compared to $745.0 million for 2005.
Total unit sales of 2.75 million units in 2006 is slightly lower than the 2.81 million units in 2005
due to lower unit sales of air-conditioners. The unit sales of refrigerators and freezers in China
increased by 4% compared to 2005.
Despite strong competition in the market, Xinfei’s net profit attributable for 2006 was $43.8 million
compared to $19.2 million in 2005. This increase included the Group’s additional 39% equity
interest in Xinfei acquired in January 2006.
Xinfei has put in place new sales programs, cost-saving measures and improved research and
development programs to develop new products which will re-position Xinfei’s growth for the next
few years. Xinfei is also expanding its production capacity with the construction of a new plant to
increase total capacity by an additional 1 million units of refrigerators.

 Sponsorships 

Since 2006, Xinfei has sponsored the "Frestech Pan Delta Super Racing Festival" and the 2007 FIA GT Championship China Round, both are motorsport events held at the Zhuhai International Circuit.

In 2008, in addition to sponsoring the "Pan Delta Super Racing Festival", Frestech also sponsors the Formula Racing Developments Formula Renault racing team. Both the no. 5 (Jim Ka To) and no. 6 (Zuo Xiao-Long') cars carry Frestech branding for the whole season.

External links 
 Homepage (English)
 https://web.archive.org/web/20071029014027/http://www.hlasia.com.sg/prod_home.htm

References 

Manufacturing companies of China
Companies established in 1994
Refrigerators